The Comper Mouse was a 1930s British three-seat cabin monoplane designed by Nicholas Comper, and built by the Comper Aircraft Company at Heston Aerodrome in 1933.

Development
The Mouse was a low-wing monoplane touring aircraft, powered by a 130 hp (97 kW) de Havilland Gipsy Major piston engine. Construction was mainly of fabric-covered spruce wood frames, with some plywood-covered sections. It had folding wings, retractable main landing gear and fixed tailskid. Accommodation was for the pilot and two passengers, accessible via a sliding framed canopy, plus an additional luggage locker. 

The first flight of the Mouse was at Heston aerodrome on 11 September 1933, piloted by Nick Comper. In February 1934, it was assessed at A&AEE Martlesham Heath, leading to various small design changes.

Operational history
On 13–14 July 1934, the Mouse (registered G-ACIX) was flown by E.H. Newman in handicapped heats for the King's Cup Race at Hatfield Aerodrome in poor weather conditions. It failed to reach the final race, despite an average speed of 132.75 mph. In an already competitive market for touring aircraft, the Mouse failed to attract sales, and only the one was completed before the company ceased trading in August 1934.

Specifications

Notes

References
Boughton, Terence. 1963. The Story of The British Light Aeroplane. John Murray

Lewis, Peter. 1970. British Racing and Record-Breaking Aircraft. Putnam 
Meaden, Jack & Fillmore, Malcolm. (Summer 2005). The Comper Lightplanes. Air-Britain Archive (quarterly). Air-Britain. 
Riding, Richard T. 1987. Ultralights: The Early British Classics. Patrick Stephens 
Riding, Richard T. June 1988. British Pre-war Lightplanes No.1: Comper Mouse. Aeroplane Monthly. IPC Media
Riding, Richard T. March 2003. Database: Comper Swift. Aeroplane Monthly. IPC Media 
Smith, Ron. 2002. British Built Aircraft Vol.1: Greater London

External links

Nick Comper official website
UK Civil Aviation Authority registration record for G-ACIX

1930s British civil utility aircraft
Mouse
Aircraft first flown in 1933
Single-engined tractor aircraft
Low-wing aircraft
Conventional landing gear